Guillermo Trujillo (1927-2018) was a painter from Panama. He was born in Horconcitos, Chiriqui, Panama. He started his studies in Panama and completed them in Madrid. In 1959 he obtained an Honorable Mention in the Biennial of São Paulo, and has continued to receive awards. Trujillo incorporated elements of native art and hieratic figures in a very contemporary style in his canvases. His compositions included political and social satires, as well as man related to nature. His works Iconografía del Cantoral Chocoe and Tres Maestros.
His daughter is the celebrated painter Isabel de Obaldía born in 1957.

References

External links
 on latinartmuseum.com in Spanish
 on legacyfineartpanama.com list of his expositions

1927 births
2018 deaths
Panamanian painters